Maidan is a village development committee in Arghakhanchi District in the Lumbini Zone of southern Nepal. At the time of the 1991 Nepal census it had a population of 4,474 and had 792 houses in the village.

References

Populated places in Arghakhanchi District